Harold Angus (10 November 1904 – 30 October 1940) was a British wrestler. He competed in the men's freestyle featherweight at the 1928 Summer Olympics. He also competed in the lightweight category at the 1930 British Empire Games for England.

He was an insurance inspector at the time of the 1930 Games and lived in Doncaster. He died following a shooting accident in October 1940.

References

External links
 

1904 births
1940 deaths
British male sport wrestlers
Olympic wrestlers of Great Britain
Wrestlers at the 1928 Summer Olympics
Sportspeople from Wigan
Commonwealth Games medallists in wrestling
Wrestlers at the 1930 British Empire Games
Commonwealth Games silver medallists for England
Firearm accident victims
Hunting accident deaths
Deaths by firearm in England
Accidental deaths in England
Medallists at the 1930 British Empire Games